Omer Ahmed Fadlallah Al-Fahal (born 1956) (Arabic: عمر فضل الله الفحل)  is a Sudanese writer, poet, and an expert in e-government systems and projects. He holds a Ph.D. degree in computer science, specializing in information system.

His Life 
He was born in the land of Al-Ailafoun in the state of Khartoum on January 1, 1956, on the Blue Nile, specifically east of the Blue Nile and south of Soba in the east. He grew up in the middle of family of religion and knowledge. His father used to narrate poetry and narrated on the authority of Wad Al-Radhi, who had a kinship between him and them. In addition, he has eight brothers. He memorized the Qur'an and poetry when he was young and passed the secondary certificate exams from the homes of Khartoum. He was among the top ten. He joined the University of Khartoum, where he spent one year, then left it for the lack of stability in his studies and traveled to Saudi Arabia, where he completed his university education at King Abdul Aziz University in Jeddah in which he obtained a bachelor's degree in media in 1981. Omar traveled to the United States of America, where he got a master's degree and a doctorate in computer science, specializing in information systems, after that he returned to work in Saudi Arabia until 1991. Omar returned to his homeland Sudan. He was among the founders of the Khartoum Center for Strategic Studies and the National Center For information in Sudan, He moved to the United Arab Emirates and stayed there until 2018, and then he moved to the United States of America.

Educational Stages 
Omar started memorizing the Qur'an like his peers in Al-Ailifoun in the retreat of Al-Faki Al-Amin and Dr. Abu Saleh, and then the primary at that time in Al-Alifoun Primary, then Central, High School in Bahri Governmental, Al-Jili High School, he sat in Sudan to get his certificate exam in the old houses of Khartoum, and he has one of the first Sudanese secondary certificates. Omar joined University of Khartoum, his major was Economics but he left it after a year because of instability, however, he received a scholarship at King Abdul Aziz University in Jeddah his major was Arts of Media and Communication Sciences in 1976, then graduated in 1981 with a bachelor's degree, after he traveled to the United States of America, specifically California, Los Angeles he got his master's and doctorate degree in 1987 at University of California.

Career Life 
He started working as a technical documentation specialist at Leighton Company in Saudi Arabia until 1990, then returned to Sudan to work as a Professor at Sudanese universities and founder of a of research and studies institutions and centers until 1999.

He moved to work in the United Arab Emirates in the former Department of Public Works in the capital of UAE in Abu Dhabi, during which he managed documentation of engineering systems and applications. Omar Fadlallah worked as an active member in the management of the Software development life cycle using the agile methodology or the so-called agile methodology. He worked as an active member in  number of projects such as: Buildings Knowledge Base System, Building Permits Management System, CAD Engineering and Design Applications, Building Industry Information System, Commercial Licensing System, Facilities Management and Maintenance System, Infrastructure Management and Maintenance System, Land Management System, Oracle Financial System, Project Management Applications, Public health management system, 3D visualization and presentation system, website project, registration system, value engineering information system, and decision support system. In addition, Omar worked as an active member in a number of management information systems projects, including: Sheikh Zayed Grand Mosque Abu Dhabi, Zayed Center for studies and research, Professor of Al Jazeera, Emirates Palace Hotel, working on restructuring the Information Technology Department at the Emirates Heritage Club and hiring workers in the field of information technology. He worked in the department until 2004 as an IT project manager.

At the beginning of 2005 Abu Dhabi City Municipality and Al Ain Municipality, Department of Works, and the Department of Agriculture and Animal Production in Al Ain have merged into one department under the name Department of Municipalities and Agriculture,
After that, Omar worked as an information systems consultant in the parent Emirates Investment Company from 2006 to 2007, and then started working in 2007 with C4 Advanced Solutions, the subsidiary company of the Emirates Investment Advanced Company as an information systems consultant to create and write work policies in According to the standards of Infrastructure Library TIL Infrastructure, Documentation for Internal Operations Procedures and SOP, Creation of IT Policy and ICT Security Policy, Creation and Procedure of Backup Plans, Creation of Local Procedures for ERP Servers for SAP, Technical Documentation for Proactive Maintenance for SQL Server database servers, Oracle servers, Voiceover Internet devices, as well as technical documents for the intranet. Internet, local area network, data centers, physical networks, computers, SAN storage devices and create training documents, and created in coordination with designers programmers, engineers, developers and technical staff to create graphic images, flowcharts and diagrams to be included in the documentation and create the necessary technical documents for the provision of IT services. He worked for the company until 2018, after which he devoted himself to fiction, technical projects and freelance work.

Awards 
He got the second place in Tayeb Salah international prize for creative writing in his eight session for his novel “Tashriqat ul-Maghribi” in February 2018.

The Katara prize for his Arabic novel fiction in fourth session in the published novels section for the novel “Anfas  Solaiha” in October 2018.

It is worth noting that both of the two winning novels in 2018 belong to the same knowledge narrative project known as “The Documentary knowledge novel series for the history of Sudan”

His works

Literary works

Books translated to other languages 
The author's works including his novel, which won the Al-Katara award in the category of novels published in October 2018. Have translated into English as solaiha's breath, he has many other novels. Including "The King's Translator" which was translated into English and is being translated into French, the novels "The Spectra of the Universe" and "Nelophobia", which been translated into English and is being translated into French, the novel "Tashriqat ul-Maghribi" is being translated into English, and the novel "Aisha's vision”.

References 

1956 births
Living people
20th-century Sudanese poets
Sudanese novelists
21st-century Sudanese poets